Polystyrene may refer to:
Polystyrene, a synthetic material (eg: Styrofoam)
Polystyrene sulfonate, group of medications that treat blood potassium levels
Poly Styrene (1957–2011), the stage-name of Marianne Elliott-Said, a Somali-British punk musician